The Independence Day of Somalia is a national holiday observed annually in Somalia on July 1. The date celebrates the unification of the Trust Territory of Italian Somaliland and the British Somaliland on July 1, 1960, which formed the Somali Republic. A government was subsequently formed by Abdullahi Issa and Muhammad Haji Ibrahim Egal and other members of the trusteeship and protectorate governments, with speaker of the SOMALIA ACT OF UNION Hagi Bashir Ismail Yussuf as President of the Somali National Assembly, Aden Abdullah Osman Daar as President of the Somali Republic, On July 20, 1961 and through a popular referendum, the people of Somalia ratified a new constitution, which was first drafted in 1960.

Notes

References

Events in Somalia
Somalia
July observances